The following is a complete list of cases decided by the United States Supreme Court organized by volume of the United States Reports in which they appear. This is a list of volumes of U.S. Reports, and the links point to the contents of each individual volume. Each volume was edited by one of the Reporters of Decisions of the Supreme Court. As of the beginning of the October 2019 Term, there were 574 bound volumes of the U.S. Reports. There were another 14 volumes worth of opinions available as "slip opinions", which are preliminary versions of the opinion published on the Supreme Court's website.

Volumes edited by Dallas

 1 
 2
 3
 4

Volumes edited by Cranch

 5
 6
 7
 8
 9
 10
 11
 12
 13

Volumes edited by Wheaton

 14
 15
 16
 17
 18
 19
 20
 21
 22
 23
 24
 25

Volumes edited by Peters

 26
 27
 28
 29
 30
 31
 32
 33
 34
 35
 36
 37
 38
 39
 40
 41

Volumes edited by Howard

 42
 43
 44
 45
 46
 47
 48
 49
 50
 51
 52
 53
 54
 55
 56
 57
 58
 59
 60
 61
 62
 63
 64
 65

Volumes edited by Black

 66
 67

Volumes edited by Wallace

 68
 69
 70
 71
 72
 73
 74
 75
 76
 77
 78
 79
 80
 81
 82
 83
 84
 85
 86
 87
 88
 89
 90

Volumes edited by Otto

 91
 92
 93
 94
 95
 96
 97
 98
 99
 100
 101
 102
 103
 104
 105
 106
 107

Volumes edited by Davis

 108
 109
 110
 111
 112
 113
 114
 115
 116
 117
 118
 119
 120
 121
 122
 123
 124
 125
 126
 127
 128
 129
 130
 131
 132
 133
 134
 135
 136
 137
 138
 139
 140
 141
 142
 143
 144
 145
 146
 147
 148
 149
 150
 151
 152
 153
 154
 155
 156
 157
 158
 159
 160
 161
 162
 163
 164
 165
 166
 167
 168
 169
 170
 171
 172
 173
 174
 175
 176
 177
 178
 179
 180
 181
 182
 183
 184
 185
 186

Volumes edited by Butler

 187
 188
 189
 190
 191
 192
 193
 194
 195
 196
 197
 198
 199
 200
 201
 202
 203
 204
 205
 206
 207
 208
 209
 210
 211
 212
 213
 214
 215
 216
 217
 218
 219
 220
 221
 222
 223
 224
 225
 226
 227
 228
 229
 230
 231
 232
 233
 234
 235
 236
 237
 238
 239
 240
 241

Volumes edited by Knaebel

 242
 243
 244
 245
 246
 247
 248
 249
 250
 251
 252
 253
 254
 255
 256
 257
 258
 259
 260
 261
 262
 263
 264
 265
 266
 267
 268
 269
 270
 271
 272
 273
 274
 275
 276
 277
 278
 279
 280
 281
 282
 283
 284
 285
 286
 287
 288
 289
 290
 291
 292
 293
 294
 295
 296
 297
 298
 299
 300
 301
 302
 303
 304
 305
 306
 307
 308
 309
 310
 311
 312
 313
 314
 315
 316
 317
 318
 319
 320
 321

Volumes edited by Wyatt

 322 
 323 
 324 
 325 
 326
 327
 328
 329
 330
 331
 332
 333
 334
 335
 336
 337
 338
 339
 340
 341
 342
 343
 344
 345
 346
 347
 348
 349
 350
 351
 352
 353
 354
 355
 356
 357
 358
 359
 360
 361
 362
 363
 364
 365
 366
 367
 368
 369
 370
 371
 372
 373
 374
 375

Volumes edited by Putzel

 376
 377
 378
 379
 380
 381
 382
 383
 384
 385
 386
 387
 388
 389
 390
 391
 392
 393
 394
 395
 396
 397
 398
 399
 400
 401
 402
 403
 404
 405
 406
 407
 408
 409
 410
 411
 412
 413
 414
 415
 416
 417
 418
 419
 420
 421
 422
 423
 424
 425
 426
 427
 428
 429
 430
 431
 432
 433
 434
 435
 436
 437
 438
 439
 440
 441
 442
 443
 444

Volumes edited by Lind

 445
 446
 447
 448
 449
 450
 451
 452
 453
 454
 455
 456
 457
 458
 459
 460
 461
 462
 463
 464
 465
 466
 467
 468
 469
 470
 471
 472
 473
 474
 475
 476
 477
 478
 479

Volumes edited by Wagner

 480
 481
 482
 483
 484
 485
 486
 487
 488
 489
 490
 491
 492
 493
 494
 495
 496
 497
 498
 499
 500
 501
 502
 503
 504
 505
 506
 507
 508
 509
 510
 511
 512
 513
 514
 515
 516
 517
 518
 519
 520
 521
 522
 523
 524
 525
 526
 527
 528
 529
 530
 531
 532
 533
 534
 535
 536
 537
 538
 539
 540
 541
 542
 543
 544
 545
 546
 547
 548
 549
 550
 551
 552
 553
 554
 555
 556
 557
 558
 559
 560
 561

Volumes edited by Fallon

 562
 563
 564
 565
 566
 567
 568
 569
 570
 571
 572
 573
 574
 575
 576
 577
 578
 579
 580
 581
 582
 583
 584
 585
 586
 587
 588
 589
 590
 591

Volumes edited by Womeldorf

 592
 593
 594
 595
 596
 597
 598

Notes 
  The first volume of the United States Reports predates the creation of the Supreme Court and does not contain any of its decisions. It is designated volume one because the same reporter, Alexander J. Dallas, published volumes 1–4.
  Ernest Knaebel resigned as Reporter of Decisions in 1944, and the post was vacant for two years. When Walter Wyatt took office in 1946, he edited the volumes 322-325 with cases for the preceding years.

See also 
Lists of United States Supreme Court cases
Number of U.S. Supreme Court cases decided by year

References